Bradley Groves (born 29 January 1982 in Parramatta, Australia) is a former Australian soccer player who last played for Manly United from 2004 to 2010. Although right-footed, he can be deployed anywhere in midfield, including the left side.
Groves was part of the most successful Australian Football Team being the 1999 U/17 Joeys, under Les Schenflug. The team were defeated in a penalty shoot-out at the 1999 FIFA U/17 World Cup Final held in New Zealand by Brazil. The squad are the only Australian team to make the final of a FIFA tournament and received a FIFA Silver medal. He is currently the reserve grade striker at Ourimbah United Football Club

Singapore

Loaned out to Tampines Rovers of the Singapore S.League in 2003, Groves took part in a few training sessions with the club before marking his S.League debut against Jurong, getting a minor concussion and being stretchered off the field with 12 minutes left to go.

Then Tampines Rovers' coach Des Bulpin stated that he needed to participate in two to three games in order to settle in. We have seen in training the talent he has and what he will bring to our team. His vision and ball retention are second to none. I'm excited to see what he produces throughout the season.

Personal life

Born in Parramatta to Lynn and Michael Groves, he has three sisters- Natalie, Belinda and Michelle.
Married in 2008 to his longtime sweetheart Kim Groves.

References

External links 
 at OzFootball

Association football midfielders
1982 births
Leeds United F.C. players
Australian expatriate sportspeople in England
Tampines Rovers FC players
Singapore Premier League players
Australian expatriate soccer players
Bonnyrigg White Eagles FC players
Australian soccer players
Living people
People from Parramatta
Expatriate footballers in England
Expatriate footballers in Singapore
Australian expatriate sportspeople in Singapore
Manly United FC players
Northern Spirit FC players
Parramatta Power players